Catherine Lubetzki is a French neurologist who is a professor at Sorbonne University. She is head of the Department of Neurological Diseases at the Pitié-Salpêtrière Hospital, where she coordinates the Salpêtrière Multiple Sclerosis clinical research centre. Her research involves the physiology of multiple sclerosis, and the identification of the interactions between myelin and axons. In 2019, she was awarded the Multiple Sclerosis International Federation Charcot Award.

Early life and education 
Lubetzki completed her medical training at the Paris Descartes University. She became interested in neurology after a selection process left her the last member of year group to choose a rotation. She ended up in a neurosurgery rotation, and completed a year in research at the Collège de France. She worked alongside Jacques Glowinski on neuropharmacology and first interacted with people with multiple sclerosis, realising that they were not receiving appropriate medical care. She worked as a clinical researcher identifying new immunotherapies for multiple sclerosis. She completed her doctoral research at the Pierre and Marie Curie University, where she worked on myelin and myelin-forming cells.

Research and career 
In 1996, Lubetzki was the first to demonstrate the role of electrical activity in the induction of myelination. Experimentally, she showed that myelination can be inhibited by blocking the action potential of neighbouring axons (and vice versa). She went on to develop this research, and, concentrating on the Node of Ranvier, demonstrated conduction velocity increases with myelination. Her identification that the rate and efficacy of oligodendrocyte progenitor cells are critical in myelination could help to identify new repair strategies. Using in vitro screening, Lubetzki has developed pro-myelinating therapeutic candidates, and is testing the impact of electrical stimulation at the Paris Brain Institute.

Lubetzki served as President of the Scientific Committee for the French Multiple Sclerosis Research Association. In 2019, she was the first woman to be awarded the Multiple Sclerosis International Federation Charcot Award.

Awards and honours 
 2008 Grand Prix scientifique de la Fondation NRJ
 2010 Sobeck Award
 2015 Foundation pour la Recherche Medicale Camille Woringer Award
 2019 Multiple Sclerosis International Federation Charcot Award
 2021 Pasteur-Weizmann/Servier Prize

Selected publications

References 

Living people
Pierre and Marie Curie University alumni
Paris Descartes University alumni
20th-century French women scientists
21st-century French women scientists
French neurologists
Academic staff of Paris-Sorbonne University
20th-century French scientists
21st-century French scientists
Women neurologists
Year of birth missing (living people)